The establishment of the Special Assistance Program in Victorian Primary Schools was the most significant development in remedial education in Australia. It was a Hamer Liberal Government initiated strategic plan designed to address falling literacy and numeracy standards. The totally new component of the Special Assistance Program was the provision of 1000 Special Assistance Resource Teachers (SARTs) for the delivery of services to children with learning needs. These designated teachers were also given an on-site school responsibility for facilitating a productive relationship between parents and pupils and teachers. The program involved the training of these primary teachers as SARTs and their placement in schools. Their role was the early detection and remediation of children at risk of illiteracy and innumeracy. The position was the focus of this substantial change in the delivery of special educational services to children at risk of illiteracy and innumeracy. The role incorporated all the elements of services previously performed by external consultants visiting schools.

The Special Assistance Program

The development and implementation of the Special Assistance Program in Victorian Primary Schools during the period 1979 - 1982 constituted the most significant innovation in the provision of special education services to children experiencing learning difficulties and in addressing declining literacy and numeracy standards.

Up until the political directive to initiate this program was given, there had been no policy within the Department of Education and Early Childhood Development (previously Education Department of Victoria) directing Principals of Primary Schools to develop special programs for pupils at risk of illiteracy and innumeracy.
 
In July 1979, the Assistant Minister of Education the Hon. Norman Lacy established a Ministerial Committee on Special Assistance Programs. The committee consisted of people drawn from school staffs, special education facilities, teacher training institutions and the Education Department administration. The committee's report was the basis upon which the Special Assistance Program was established. The major components recommended for the program were:
 the designation of a Special Assistance Resource Teacher (SART) at 877 Primary Schools throughout Victoria (full-time at 575 schools with more than 300 pupils; and half-time at 302 schools with between 150 and 300 pupils)
 the development of 20-day Special Assistance In-Service Training Course to be delivered to designated SARTs without formal training in Special Education at four teacher training colleges
 the re-organisation of the existing special education support services into 50 state wide Special Assistance Support Centres to be accessed by each primary school through its SART.

The process for the establishment of the Special Assistance Program in Victorian Primary Schools was outlined in a speech made by Mr Lacy to SARTs at a seminar on 15 December 1980.

Special Assistance Resource Teachers

Concept

The concept of a school based resource teacher identifying deficits in literacy and numeracy in individual children and providing assistance and resources to classroom teachers to address those deficits through special programs had been supported by the findings of numerous major committees of inquiry. Reports such as:
 the Report of the UK Committee of Inquiry appointed by the Secretary of State for Education and Science (the Bullock Report, 1975)
 the Report of the Australian Parliament's House of Representatives Select Committee on Specific Learning Difficulties (the Cadman Report, 1976)
 the Report of the Working Party on Provisions for Children with Special Needs (ACT, 1977)
 the Report of the UK Committee of Inquiry into the Education of Handicapped Children and Young People (the Warnock Report, 1978)
 the Report of Task Force 8 to the Victorian State Council for Special Education (1979)
 the Report of the Victorian Ministerial Committee on Special Assistance Programs (1980)
   
The educational philosophy that was the foundation upon which the Special Assistance Program was built had its origins in these reports. That philosophy recognises the profound influence that a child's learning environment has on his behaviour and learning. It also acknowledges the right of children to have their learning needs met in common structural and social conditions. Arising from this philosophical perspective emerges the inescapable proposition that special assistance for children at risk of illiteracy and innumeracy (over and above the normal learning provisions available to all children) is an essential part of a school's functioning and that the designation of a specially trained resource teacher to provide that assistance to children, their classroom teachers and their parents is an integral part of a team approach to curriculum development, teaching and all other aspects of schooling. This position was strongly supported by both the Australian Schools Commission's Report for the Triennium 1976-78 and the Warnock Report, which went further to assert that if ordinary schools are to improve in their efforts for children with special needs they will require special support from within their organisation.

Functions

The role and functions of the SARTs were specifically prescribed by the Government after extensive consultation with the Victorian Teachers Union (VTU) and the Victorian Primary Principals Association (VPPA). They were:
 To advise and assist classroom teachers in respect to: - the identification of children in need of special assistance, - the diagnosis of the learning problems being experienced by such children, - the prescription of appropriate programs of special assistance which may be necessary to treat such problems, - the implementation of such programs
 To consult with and assist parents in respect to their role in the implementation of any program of special assistance which has been prescribed for their children
 To identify and recommend for referral children in need of psychological guidance, speech therapy or other specialist services
 To ensure that children needing special assistance continue to participate in appropriate programs throughout their primary school life.

Appointment

The implementation of the first stage of the Special Assistance Program was only possible after further consultation and a signed agreement by the Minister of Educational Services the Hon. Norman Lacy with the VTU and the VPPA.

As a result, from the beginning of the 1981 school year SARTs were designated by their schools and appointed to the 575 primary schools with enrolments of greater than 300 pupils. They were mandated to establish the Special Assistance Program in their schools. The Education Department's Special Services Division and the Primary Division monitored the progress of the implementation and produced a number of evaluative reports that were presented to the Minister.

From the beginning of the 1982 school year, schools with an enrolment of between 150 and 300 pupils designated and appointed a SART to carry out the role on a half-time basis. This resulted in and additional 302 primary schools in Victoria having a school based resource teacher, bringing the total to 877 schools. It was not planned to designate a SART at schools with less than 150 pupils. At such schools it was planned that the Principal or an appointed staff member would access services from the Special Assistance Resource Centres for children at these schools in need of such services.

In-Service Training Courses for SARTs
A major component of stage one was the in-service education component for the SARTs designated by their schools for the new role. A survey of the qualifications and experience of the 575 designated SARTs was undertaken to assess their training requirements. The responses indicated that 200 of the designated teachers had already completed special education training courses. Of these 102 were also experienced in special education teaching. As well 28 of the 375 remaining designated teachers were experienced special education teachers.

Four teacher training colleges (Melbourne, Burwood, Bendigo and Warrnambool) were chosen to provide the training programs. A course planning committee was established and drew up a set of principles and a course content outline for a 20-day, one day per week special assistance training course. The course content dealt with approaches to language teaching (especially reading), mathematics teaching, and identification of learning problems. The focus of the course was to enable SARTs to devise and implement programs of special assistance in their own schools. An invitation to enrol in the course was sent to all designated SARTs by the Acting Director of Teacher Education on 29 January 1981. They were told that attendance at the courses was voluntary. The responses received by the colleges overwhelmed them. Very few SARTs did not enrol in the course and many teachers from schools of less than 300 pupils were voluntarily designated by their Principals as SARTS and also sought enrolment in the training course. As a result, not all requests for the in-service training course in the Special Assistance Program could be met in the first year of its availability. During 1981, 290 SARTs undertook the course.

The response from schools to the in-service training course was way beyond the Education Department's expectations and reflected the extent of expressed and latent concerns schools had for children at risk of illiteracy and innumeracy. A survey of 160 teachers who had completed this course found that, despite initial concerns, there was a good deal of support from school principals and teachers for the SART concept. However, most SARTs felt they needed more in-service training or further training in special education before they felt competent to fulfil their roles. AREA shared a concern that teachers undertaking SART duties were not qualified in special education, but their proposals to the course committee were rejected.

References

Educational assessment and evaluation
Educational administration
Education in Australia
Education in Victoria (Australia)